Shaji Prabhakaran is an Indian football administrator, and current general secretary of the All India Football Federation (AIFF). He was also the president of Football Delhi but since he is the existing general secretary of AIFF, to avoid any conflict of interest he quit the president's role of Football Delhi. He is also the former FIFA South Central Asia Development Officer.

Biography
Shaji hails from Kerala. He began playing football at the age of 8, but did not have the opportunity to receive professional training or coaching. As football was not popular in his school at the time he played volleyball and cricket.

At the age of 15, he started playing for a local teagarden club (Binnaguri) in the Dooars area of West Bengal. From that point football then became an integral part of Shaji's life.

Shaji Prabhakaran graduated from Lakshmibai National Institute of Physical Education (LNIPE), Gwalior in 1994. In 2000 he returned to LNIPE and completed his Doctorate (Ph.D) in Physical Education (football).

He was appointed as the president of the Football Delhi on 19 November 2017.  He is also the director of Delhi United SC.

He started his career as a Senior Consultant at the Asian Football Confederation in 2017 following his long association with AIFF as Director of Vision & National Teams. Subsequently, Shaji got elected as the Delhi Soccer Association President, now known as Football Delhi.

In April, 2017 he got appointed as the President and then as Director of the Delhi-based professional I-League level club, Delhi United FC, which competes in the 2nd division.

He was the manager and coach at the CFA (Chandigarh Football Academy) for four years.

He is associated with Mumbai-based sports company, SE TransStadia Pvt Ltd as General Manager and then as Associate Vice President. Shaji is also the founder of football Khelo Foundation.

Literary works
Prabhakaran has authored the book Back to the Roots: A Definitive Guide to Grassroots & Football Development.

Notes

References

External links
 
 

Living people
1972 births
People from Alappuzha district
Indian football executives
Indian sports executives and administrators